Seigner is a surname, likely of French origin. Notable people with the surname include:

Emmanuelle Seigner (born 1966), French former fashion model, singer, and actress
Françoise Seigner (1928-2008), French actress
Gaston Seigner (1878-1918), French equestrian
Louis Seigner (1903-1991), French actor
Mathilde Seigner (born 1968), French actress